Paolo Semeraro (born 15 March 1962) is an Italian sailor. He competed at the 1984 Summer Olympics and the 1988 Summer Olympics.

References

External links
 

1962 births
Living people
Italian male sailors (sport)
Olympic sailors of Italy
Sailors at the 1984 Summer Olympics – Finn
Sailors at the 1988 Summer Olympics – Finn
Sportspeople from Bari